The 2003 Australian Formula 3 Championship was a CAMS sanctioned motor racing competition open to Formula 3 cars. The championship, which was the third Australian Formula 3 Championship, was contested over an eight-round series organised and administered by Formula 3 Australia Inc. Michael Caruso won the drivers title from Barton Mawer and James Cressy.

Calendar
The championship was contested over an eight-round series with two races per round.

Points system
Points towards the Australian Formula 3 Championship were awarded on a 20–15–12–10–8–6–4–3–2–1 basis at each race. One point was awarded to the driver gaining pole position for each race and one point was awarded to the driver setting the fastest race lap in each race. Points towards the Yokohama Formula 3 Australia Trophy were awarded on a similar basis.

Points towards the Australian Formula 3 Engine Manufacturers Championship were awarded on a 20–15–12–10–8–6–4–3–2–1 basis at each race with the first engine of each manufacturer home scoring the equivalent number of points as per the position of the driver. Points towards the Yokohama Formula 3 Australia Engine Manufacturers Trophy were awarded on a similar basis.

Results

2003 Australian Formula 3 Championship

Yokohama Formula 3 Australia Trophy

The Yokohama Formula 3 Australia Trophy was open to cars constructed prior to 31 December 1996.

Australian Formula 3 Engine Manufacturers Championship

Yokohama Formula 3 Australia Engine Manufacturers Trophy

References

Australian Formula 3 seasons
Formula 3 Championship
Australia
Australian Formula 3